Bryodemella is a genus of grasshoppers belonging to the tribe Bryodemini; the genus was first described by Yin in 1982.

The species of this genus are found in Eurasia.

Species
The Orthoptera Species File lists:
subgenus Bryodemella Yin, 1982
 Bryodemella diamesum (Bey-Bienko, 1930)
 Bryodemella elegans Li, 1997
 Bryodemella gansuensis (Zheng, 1985)
 Bryodemella holdereri (Krauss, 1901) - type species
 Bryodemella nigrifemura Yin & Wang, 2005
 Bryodemella nigripennis Zheng, Zhang & Zeng, 2011
 Bryodemella rufifemura Zhang, Zhi & Zhang, 2018
 Bryodemella tuberculata (Fabricius, 1775)
 Bryodemella xinjiangensis Yin & Wang, 2005
 Bryodemella xizangensis Yin, 1984
subgenus Marikovskiella Benediktov, 2009
 Bryodemella Angaridella Benediktov, 1998
 Bryodemella orientalis (Bey-Bienko, 1930)
 Bryodemella semenovi (Ikonnikov, 1911)
 Bryodemella zaisanica (Bey-Bienko, 1930)

References

Acrididae
Orthoptera genera